Thorrington is a village and civil parish in the Tendring district of Essex, England. The striking medieval flint church is dedicated to Mary Magdalene, and the patrons of the church are St John's College, Cambridge.

Thorrington is mentioned in the Domesday Book as Torinduna. From handwritten sources held by the Church, Thorrington has also been known as Turituna (1152–71); Torritona (1202), Thurituna (1237), Thurington (1248), Thurinton (1253). Thorinton (1255), Tornidune (1272), Tyriton (1274), Thornton (1285), Thoriton (1295), Thoweryngton (1476), Thurrington (1594).

Geography
On the west side, the Tenpenny Brook forms the parish boundary between Thorrington and Alresford. At the point where the brook flows into the Alresford Creek (a branch of the Colne Estuary) stands Thorrington Mill. This is a tide mill built in 1831 and now a Grade II* listed building. The east and northern boundaries of the parish are bounded by the Saltwater Brook.  Where the Saltwater Brook flows into Flag Creek (formerly Borefleet Creek or Byrflytt) is the former site of another Tidal Mill.

The village is now almost connected by recently-built (2000s) housing to Thorrington Cross, a hamlet of mixed industrial & retail premises, smallholdings and inter-war ribbon development villas at the crossroads of the B1029 (the Brightlingsea road) and the B1027 (Wivenhoe to Clacton). 

The Colchester to Clacton railway line passes just to the north of the village.  Thorrington's station - spelled 'Thorrington' on the Ordnance Survey map, but 'Thorington' as far as the railway companies were concerned - was opened in 1867, and closed in 1957. Great Bentley station is now the closest rail station, located around 2 miles north-east of the village.

Local schools
Great Bentley Primary School is the nearest primary school which serves the catchments of Thorrington, Great Bentley, Frating, Little Bentley and Aingers Green, which caters for around 210 boys and girls aged 4–11. 
This school was built in 1896 and has recently undertaken some rebuilding work in 2003, maintaining its historic front throughout.
Currently, this school is rated good or two in its latest Ofsted inspection report.

Governance
There are several elected representatives at different levels of government which act for Thorrington and the surrounding villages. There are two Thorrington, Frating, Elmstead and Great Bromley district councillors who represent the area at Tendring District Council. The population of the above ward was at the 2011 census 4,687.  The current district councillors are Gary Scott (LibDem) and Ann Wiggins (LibDem).

The current Brightlingsea County Councillor who represents the area at Essex County Council is Alan Goggin (Conservative).

The current Harwich and North Essex MP who represents the area in the House of Commons is the Rt Hon Sir Bernard Jenkin (Conservative).

Related places
Thorrington was the name of the home of an estate agent, Charles Clark (1824-1906), who arrived in Christchurch, New Zealand, in 1856. Presumably he had a connection with Thorrington in England.  He was living at this house at the time of his marriage in 1865.  It led to the naming of Thorrington Road in the area, and then to Thorrington School, a primary school on Colombo Street, Christchurch.

References

External links

 Link to National Archive
 Entry in Kelly's Directory of Essex, 1882
 
 Thorrington tide mill 

Villages in Essex
Civil parishes in Essex
Tendring